Treat Huey and Nathaniel Lammons were the defending champions but chose not to defend their title.

Andrey Golubev and Aleksandr Nedovyesov won the title after defeating Szymon Walków and Jan Zieliński 7–5, 6–7(5–7), [10–5] in the final.

Seeds

Draw

References

External links
 Main draw

Split Open - Doubles
Split Open